Epichloë pampeana is a hybrid asexual species in the fungal genus Epichloë. 

A systemic and seed-transmissible grass symbiont first described in 2009,  Epichloë pampeana is a natural allopolyploid of Epichloë festucae and a strain from the Epichloë typhina complex (from Poa nemoralis).

Epichloë pampeana is found in South America, where it has been identified in the grass species Bromus auleticus.

References

pampeana
Fungi described in 2009
Fungi of South America